John Jatau Kadiya was a Nigerian politician, administrator and former minister. He was a senatorial candidate for the Plateau North senatorial election in 1979, and  the gubernatorial candidate in the Plateau State elections of 1983, representing the National Party of Nigeria. He was a minister for aviation and the minister for the federal capital territory between 1979 to 1983. He was detained under the Administration of General Buhari in 1984 and was not released until 1985, when a new government was in place. He is from plateau state. From bassa local government area maingo. He is married to Chodi Kadiya of blessed memory, Joan Kadiya and Anne Kadiya. Has 10 children which amongst them are Nathaniel Kadiya Of blessed memory, Pauline Daze, Jibo Kadiya, Zakka Kadiya Binta Kadiya, Emmanuel Kadiya, Haruna Dandaura Kadiya, Nabo Kadiya, Yima Kadiya & Chimi Kadiya.
He was a prominent figure during the Shehu Shagari regime.
John Kadiya died on January 5, 1997.

References

1997 deaths
Year of birth missing